Henri Ey (10 August 1900, Banyuls-dels-Aspres – 8 November 1977, Banyuls-dels-Aspres) was a French neurologist, psychiatrist, psychoanalyst and philosopher.

Biography
Ey was born on 10 August 1900 in Banyuls-dels-Aspres, Pyrénées-Orientales, and died there on 9 November 1977.

After the second world war Ey renewed the group L'Evolution Psychiatrique with Eugène Minkowski.

Psychiatric theory
Ey developed an "organodynamic psychology" and a theory of the structure of states of consciousness, in which he developed ideas of Pierre Janet and John Hughlings Jackson.

It was under the title of Organodynamic Psychology that Ey developed a unifying psychology which included both organic (neurological, genetic, etc.) and psychodynamic factors.

Works
Hallucinations et Délire, Alcan 1934. réédité: Ed.: L'Harmattan; 2000, 
Des idées de Jackson à un modèle organo-dynamique en psychiatrie, Doin 1938, Privat 1975, L’Harmattan 2000, 
Le Problème de la psychogenèse des névroses et des psychoses (avec L. Bonnafé, S. Follin, J. Lacan, J. Rouart), Desclée de Brouwer, 1950. Réédition 1977 et 2004 (Tchou)
Études psychiatriques : Desclée de Brouwer t.I, 1948, 296p; t.II. 1950, 550p; t.III 1954. réédité en 2 volume et un CDRom, Préface Patrice Belzeaux et Jean Garrabé, Ed.: CREHEY Cercle de Recherche et d'Edition Henri Ey; 2007,  
Traité de psychiatrie de l’Encyclopédie Médico-chirurgicale (avec 142 collaborateurs), 3 t. 1955.
Manuel de psychiatrie (avec Bernard et Brisset), Masson 1960, 5 fois réédité.
L’Inconscient 1 vol. Desclée de Brouwer 1966, 2004 (Tchou), réédition: L'Inconscient : VIe colloque de Bonneval, Ed.: Bibliothèque des Introuvables, 2006,  
La Conscience, l vol. PUF 439p (1963) et Desclée de Brouwer 1968.
Conscience, article in Encyclopædia universalis, vol.IV, mai 1969,922–927.
La dissolution de la conscience dans le sommeil et le rêve et ses rapports avec la psychopathologie. Esquisse d'une théorie de la relativité généralisée de la désorganisation de l'être conscient et des diverses maladies mentales, in l'Evolution psychiatrique, rééd.: 2007, n0 72, 
Traité des hallucinations, Masson 1973, 2 tomes., 2004 (Tchou), Réédition T.1, Ed.: Bibliothèque des Introuvables, 2006, Tome 2, Ed.: Bibliothèque des Introuvables, 2006, 
La Notion de schizophrénie (séminaire de Thuir), Desclée de Brouwer 1975.
 Schizophrénie: études cliniques et psychopathologiques, Ed.: Empecheurs Penser en Rond, 1996, 
Psychophysiologie du sommeil et psychiatrie. Masson 1974.
Défense et illustration de la psychiatrie, Masson 1977.
Naissance de la médecine. 1 vol. Masson, 1981.
 Le déchiffrement de l'inconscient ; Travaux psychanalytiques, (texte de 1964), Ed.: L'Harmattan, 2005, 
 Neurologie et psychiatrie, (texte de 1947), Ed.: Hermann, 1998, 
Consciousness: A Phenomenological Study of Being Conscious and Becoming Conscious, Trans John H. Flodstrom, Bloomington/London: Indiana University Press, 1978.

Further reading
 Hommage à Henri Ey, Évolution psychiatrique n° spécial 1977, 530 p. (48 auteurs); avec la Bibliographie complète des œuvres de H. Ey par J. Grignon (présente aussi sur le site de l’Association H. Ey: <www.ey.asso.fr>  ).
 Blanc (C.J.), Durand, (Ch.), Kammerer (Th.), Laboucarié (J.) : article "Henri Ey" in Encyclopædia Universalis Plurisciences 1978.
 Coffin, Jean-Christophe, ed. 2008. Conceptions de la folie & pratiques de la psychiatrie. Autour d'Henri Ey. Perpignan: Association pour la Fondation Henri Ey.
 Tatossian (A.), Albernhe (T.) et Roux (J.) : La pensée de Henri Ey. Ed. médicales Spécia, 1990.
Blanc (C.J.) :
 Henri Ey, théoricien de la conscience, Actualité d’une œuvre historique, in Psychiatrie française 1996, n°1,33–46.
 Psychiatrie et pensée philosophique. Intercritique et quête sans fin. 1 vol. L’Harmattan 1998.
 Blanc (C.J.), Chazaud (J.) et coll.: La Psychopathologie et la philosophie de l’esprit au Salon.  1 vol. L’Harmattan, 2001.
Garrabe (J.)
Les Etudes cliniques et psychopathologiques sur la schizophrénie de H.Ey. Empêcheurs/Synthelabo 1996.
Henri Ey et la pensée psychiatrique contemporaine. Empêcheurs,1997.
 Palem (R.M.), Belzeaux (P.) et coll.: Henri Ey, un humaniste Catalan dans le siècle et dans l’Histoire, 1997, Ed.Trabucaire, 2 rue Jouy d’Arnaud 66140 Canet-en-Roussillon.
Palem (R.M.)
 H. Ey psychiatre et philosophe. Ed.Rive droite, Paris, 1997
 La modernité d’H. Ey: l’organodynamisme. Desclée de Brouwer éd.1997 et Soronsha Tokyo 2004 (trad. T.Fujimoto).
Organodynamisme et neurocognitivisme. L'Harmattan éd.2006
 Prats (Ph.) : Une psychiatrie philosophique : l’organodynamisme comme anthropologie, L’Harmattan éd., 2001.
 Belzeaux (P.) : Vie et œuvre de H.Ey (chronologie) sur le site WEB de l’Association pour la Fondation H.Ey : <www.ey.asso.fr>
 Charles (M.): Ey-Lacan: du dialogue au débat ou l'homme en question. L'Harmattan 2004. -Henri Ey psychiatre du XXIe. Actualité de l'œuvre d'Henri Ey", collectif de l’Assoc. Fondation HEY, Ed. : L'Harmattan, 2000.
 Jacques Chazaud, Lucien Bonnafé : La folie au naturel, le premier colloque de Bonneval comme moment décisif de la psychiatrie, l'Harmattant, 2005,  
 Evans (Ph.) : Henri Ey's concepts of the organisation of Consciousness and its disorganization: an extension of Jacksonian theory. Brain vol.95,II,1972,413–440.
 Benedetto Farinaa, Maurizio Ceccarellib, Massimo Di Giannantonioc. (2005) Henri Ey's Neojacksonism and the Psychopathology of Disintegrated Mind. Psychopathology, 38, 285–290. 
 Herbert Spiegelberg. Phenomenology in French Psychiatry: Henri Ey. In Spiegelberg's Phenomenology in Psychology and Psychiatry. Northwestern University Press. pages 114–120

References

1900 births
1977 deaths
People from Pyrénées-Orientales
French psychiatrists
20th-century French physicians
French male non-fiction writers
20th-century French philosophers
20th-century French male writers